The 2020–21 Morgan State Bears men's basketball team represented Morgan State University in the 2020–21 NCAA Division I men's basketball season. The Bears, led by second-year head coach Kevin Broadus, played their home games at Talmadge L. Hill Field House in Baltimore, Maryland as members of the Mid-Eastern Athletic Conference. With the creation of divisions to cut down on travel due to the COVID-19 pandemic, they played in the Northern Division.

Previous season
The Bears finished the 2019–20 season 15–16, 9–7 in MEAC play to finish in sixth place. They were scheduled to play against Bethune–Cookman in the quarterfinals of the MEAC tournament, but the remainder of the tournament was cancelled due to the ongoing COVID-19 pandemic.

Roster

Schedule and results 

|-
!colspan=12 style=| Regular season

|-
!colspan=12 style=| MEAC tournament
|-

|-

Source

References

Morgan State Bears men's basketball seasons
Morgan State Bears
Morgan State Bears men's basketball
Morgan State Bears men's basketball